John Hales (2 March 1648 – 8 October 1723) was an English politician who sat in the House of Commons from 1679 to 1685.

Hales was elected Member of Parliament (MP) for New Shoreham in 1679 and held the seat to 1685.

Hales died in October 1723, aged 75. His brother Edward Hales was on the Admiralty commission, and his cousin Edward Hales was MP for Hythe.

See also
Politics of England

References

1648 births
1723 deaths
People from Shoreham-by-Sea
Place of birth missing
English MPs 1679
English MPs 1680–1681
English MPs 1681